is a 1953 Japanese jidaigeki film directed by Teinosuke Kinugasa. It tells the story of a samurai (Kazuo Hasegawa) who tries to marry a woman (Machiko Kyō) he rescues, only to discover that she is already married. Filmed using Eastmancolor, Gate of Hell was Daiei Film's first color film and the first Japanese color film to be released outside Japan. It was digitally restored in 2011 by the National Film Center of the National Museum of Modern Art, Tokyo and Kadokawa Shoten Co., LTD. in cooperation with NHK.

Plot
During the Heiji Rebellion, samurai Endō Morito is assigned to escort lady-in-waiting Kesa away from the palace once she volunteers to disguise herself as the daimyō’s sister, buying the daimyō’s father and real sister time to escape unseen. Kesa is knocked unconscious when the rebels attack their caravan, and Morito takes her to his brother’s home. When Morito’s brother arrives, he reveals that he too is part of the rebellion and suggests Morito join him. Morito refuses to betray the daiyo, Lord Kiyomani. Once he and Kesa are safe, Morito proves his loyalty to Kiyomani by personally riding to him to deliver news about the insurrection. 

After the coup has failed, Morito runs into Kesa again. Infatuated with her, he asks Lord Kiyomoni, who is granting one wish to each of the loyal warriors who helped put down the rebellion, to grant him Kesa’s hand in marriage. Kiyomani informs him that Kesa is already married to Wataru, a samurai of the Imperial Guard, but Morito demands that his wish be granted. Kesa is concerned by Morito's determination, but Wataru promises to protect her.

After hearing Kesa perform koto music, Kiyomani begins to sympathize with Morito. He decides to give Morito a chance to compete for Kesa’s hand. Morito enters a horse race in which Wataru is competing, and nearly attacks Wataru at a “Forget the Race” dinner after the race is over, visibly disturbing everyone around him.

At Kesa's request, her handmaid Tone tells Marito that Kesa has gone to visit her aunt. Morito heads to the home and discovers the lie. He forces the aunt to write a note to Kesa claiming she’s sick and needs Kesa to come see her. Kesa agrees and is terrified to see Morito waiting for her. When Morito threatens to kill everyone in order to have his way with her, Kesa tells him she will fulfill his heart’s desires and details a plan for Morito to kill Wataru and claim her once she’s widowed.

Kesa returns home and behaves generously to Tone and Wataru. After everyone has gone to bed, Morito sneaks into the bedroom, dealing a decisive killing blow to a figure beneath the blankets. He is horrified to realize that he has killed Kesa. Realizing that Kesa sacrificed herself rather than subject herself or anyone else to his insanity, Morito fruitlessly begs Wataru to kill him in penance. As Wataru mourns his dead wife, Morito kneels in the courtyard, cuts off his topknot and vows to start over as a monk.

Cast

 Kazuo Hasegawa – Morito Endo
 Machiko Kyō – Lady Kesa
 Isao Yamagata – Wataru Watanabe
 Yatarō Kurokawa – Taira no Shigemori
 Kōtarō Bandō – Rokuroh
 Jun Tazaki – Kogenta
 Koreya Senda – Taira no Kiyomori
 Masao Shimizu – Fujiwara no Nobuyori
 Tatsuya Ishiguro – Yachuta
 Kenjirō Uemura – Masanaka
 Gen Shimizu – Saburosuke
 Michiko Araki – Mano
 Yoshie Minami – Tone
 Kikue Mōri – Sawa
 Ryōsuke Kagawa – Yasutada
 Kunitarō Sawamura – Moritada

Production
 Yoshinobu Nishioka - Art director

Reception
After the Japan Society sponsored a U.S. release of the film in December 1954, Bosley Crowther reviewed it for The New York Times. According to Crowther:

The secret, perhaps, of its rare excitement is the subtlety with which it blends a subterranean flood of hot emotions with the most magnificent flow of surface serenity. The tensions and agonies of violent passions are made to seethe behind a splendid silken screen of stern formality, dignity, self-discipline and sublime esthetic harmonies. The very essence of ancient Japanese culture is rendered a tangible stimulant in this film.

Awards
Gate of Hell won the grand prize award at the 1954 Cannes Film Festival, a 1955 Academy Honorary Award for "Best Foreign Language Film first released in the United States during 1954", along with the Academy Award for Best Costume Design, Color, and the 1954 New York Film Critics Circle Award for "Best Foreign Language Film". It won the Golden Leopard at the Locarno International Film Festival.

Home video
In the United Kingdom, Gate of Hell was released in 2012 on Blu-ray Disc and DVD as part of the Masters of Cinema line; the next year The Criterion Collection released it in the United States.

See also
 List of jidaigeki films
 List of historical films set in Asia

References

External links
 
 
 
 Gate of Hell: A Colorful History an essay by Stephen Prince at the Criterion Collection

1953 films
1953 drama films
1950s Japanese-language films
Samurai films
Jidaigeki films
Films set in the 12th century
Films awarded an Academy Honorary Award
Best Foreign Language Film Academy Award winners
Films that won the Best Costume Design Academy Award
Palme d'Or winners
Golden Leopard winners
Films directed by Teinosuke Kinugasa
Films produced by Masaichi Nagata
Films scored by Yasushi Akutagawa
Daiei Film films
Japanese drama films
1950s Japanese films